Elmer "Moose" Vasko (December 11, 1935 – October 30, 1998) was a Canadian professional ice hockey defenceman who played 13 seasons in the National Hockey League for the Chicago Black Hawks and Minnesota North Stars. He was on the Blackhawks team that won the Stanley Cup in 1961.

Personal
Vasko was born in Duparquet, Quebec.  He was one of the few players of Slovak descent in the NHL's younger years. Vasko also never lost any of his teeth during his NHL career, despite the lack of mouthguards or helmets in his playing days. He was a second team all star in 1962-63 and 1963-64.

Career statistics

Regular season and playoffs

External links
 

1935 births
1998 deaths
Buffalo Bisons (AHL) players
Canadian expatriate ice hockey players in the United States
Canadian ice hockey defencemen
Canadian people of Slovak descent
Chicago Blackhawks players
Ice hockey people from Quebec
Minnesota North Stars players
People from Abitibi-Témiscamingue
Salt Lake Golden Eagles (WHL) players
Stanley Cup champions
St. Catharines Teepees players